Collini is an Italian surname. Notable people with the surname include:

Cosimo Alessandro Collini (1727–1806), Italian historian
Stefan Collini (born 1947), English literary critic and academic

See also
Gustavo Collini-Sartor, Argentine dancer

Italian-language surnames